Sara J. Harper (born August 10, 1926) is a former member of the Eighth District Court of Appeals.

Harper is African-American. She was raised in a public housing project in Cleveland, Ohio. Harper got her undergraduate and law degrees from Case Western Reserve University.

Harper worked as a prosecutor for the city of Cleveland in the 1960s. In 1970 she was appointed a judge of the Cleveland Municipal Court by Ohio Governor James A. Rhodes, a position to which she was elected for a six-year-term in 1971. In 1980 Harper was the Republican Candidate for Chief Justice of Ohio. She also ran for a seat as a justice of the Ohio Supreme Court in 1994. She was president of the Cleveland branch of the NAACP for some of the 1980s. For a time she served in the United States Marine Corps judiciary. In 1990 she became a member of the Ohio Court of Appeals. She also co-founded the first victims' rights program in the country.

Harper is a member of Mount Olive Missionary Baptist Church in Cleveland.

References

1926 births
Ohio Republicans
Lawyers from Cleveland
Case Western Reserve University alumni
Ohio state court judges
Living people
African-American judges
American women judges
Baptists from Ohio
21st-century African-American people
21st-century African-American women
20th-century African-American people
20th-century African-American women